XHRYS-FM (90.1 MHz) is a radio station in Reynosa, Tamaulipas, Mexico. It broadcasts from the Multimedios tower at El Control, Tamaulipas.

External links
 Official website
 raiostationworld.com; Radio stations serving the Rio Grande Valley

References

Multimedios Radio
Radio stations in Reynosa
Contemporary hit radio stations in Mexico
Radio stations established in 1988
1988 establishments in Mexico